Mazitovo (Mäzit) is a rural locality (a village) in Muynaksky Selsoviet, Zianchurinsky District, Bashkortostan, Russia. The population was 212 as of 2010. There are 3 streets.

Geography 
Mazitovo is located 40 km southeast of Isyangulovo (the district's administrative centre) by road. Umbetovo is the nearest rural locality.

References 

Rural localities in Zianchurinsky District